Democratic backsliding has been ongoing in the United States since the late 2010s. The V-Dem Institute's electoral democracy index score for the United States peaked in 2015 and declined sharply after 2016, for which year it was also downgraded to "flawed democracy" by the Economist Intelligence Unit in its annual Democracy Index report. Both V-Dem and Freedom House downgraded the United States in 2018. Beyond the national level, democratic backsliding has occurred in American states under unified Republican Party control while Democratic Party-controlled and divided states have become more democratic.

Background
James Madison addresses the difference between a constitutional republic and a direct democracy in Federalist No. 14. He describes a democracy as a government that is exercised by the meeting of all of the people, while a republic is administered via "representatives and agents". In a 1814 letter, Madison also stated that "Remember, Democracy never lasts long. It soon wastes, exhausts, and murders itself. There never was a Democracy Yet, that did not commit suicide." Also in the 1830s, Alexis de Tocqueville warned about the "tyranny of the majority" in a democracy, and suggested the courts should try to reverse when a majority tries to terminate the rights of an unpopular minority.

Causes

In 2006, political scientist Wendy Brown argued that the United States was de-democratizing because of neoliberalism and neoconservatism. In 2017, Iranian–German sociologist Behrouz Alikhani cited the government following the interests of global corporations rather than citizens and loosening of campaign finance laws, especially the Citizens United decision, to enable the wealthy greater influence in politics. In 2021, historian Karen J. Greenberg argued that policies adopted during the war on terror enabled later democratic backsliding under the Trump administration. 

Constitutional law scholar Aziz Z. Huq says the primary causes of democratic backsliding are: "(1) the incomplete democratization of national institutions created in 1787; (2) a half century of rising inequalities in wealth, market power, and political influence; and (3) a resurgence of intolerant, authoritarian, white-ethnic identity politics associated with the Republican Party". Huq argues that the Supreme Court can be a vector of democratic backsliding by enabling these trends to connect and helping entrench political power in a permanent minority insulated from democratic competition. A number of other authors have made similar arguments based on singular cases or a broader sweep of decisions.

History and forecast

Robert Mickley and Ashley Jardina wrote in their article "White Racial Solidarity and Opposition to American Democracy" that during the twenty-first century voting rights eroded away and partisan gerrymandering by state legislatures increased. These scholars, alongside a doctor of philosophy named Robert Rowland wrote that during the presidency of Donald Trump the undermining of democratic norms would be accelerated. A paper published in The Annals of the American Academy of Political and Social Science said, "Trump undermined faith in elections, encouraged political violence, vilified the mainstream media, positioned himself as a law-and-order strongman challenging immigrants and suppressing protests, and refused to denounce support from far-right groups." 

The election of Donald Trump as president of the United States, a man who praised dictators and threatened to jail his rivals, raised many fears about how the USA may be heading back to authoritarianism, as well as punctured many Americans' beliefs about their country's exceptionalism. After Joe Biden was elected president in 2020, supporters of Trump attempted to overturn the election, including attacking the United States Capitol, which can further depict democratic backsliding. However, challenges that the American democracy is facing emerged long before the Trump administration. Since the 1980s, deepening polarization and radicalization of the Republican Party has weakened the institutional foundations that have safeguarded the American democratic system which made the Trump presidency a dangerous threat to democracy.

The Roberts Court has never struck down an election law for infringing suffrage or Equal Protection rights. On the other hand, it struck down the Voting Rights Act preclearance regime in Shelby County v. Holder (2013), which existed to prevent disenfranchisement by states. It has also not acted on partisan gerrymandering. As a whole, according to Huq, these changes shift the institutional equilibrium to "enable the replication of the system of one-party dominance akin to one that characterized the American South for much of the twentieth century".

In 2019, political scientists Robert R. Kaufman and Stephan Haggard saw "striking parallels in terms of democratic dysfunction, polarization, the nature of autocratic appeals, and the processes through which autocratic incumbents sought to exploit elected office" in the United States under Trump compared to other backsliding countries (Venezuela, Turkey, and Hungary). They argue that a change to competitive authoritarianism is possible but unlikely. In 2020, Kurt Weyland presented a qualitative model for assessing democratic continuity and reversal using historical data from the experience of other countries. His study concluded that the United States is immune to democratic reversal. In 2021, political scientists Matias López and Juan Pablo Luna criticized his methodology and selection of parameters and argued that both democratic continuity and reversal are possible. With regard to the state of scholarly research on the subject, they wrote that "the probability of observing democratic backsliding in the United States remains an open and important question".

2016 through 2020

By 2020, most state legislatures were controlled by the Republican Party, though some of those states had Democratic governors. As part of attempts to overturn the 2020 United States presidential election, many Republican legislators in seven battleground states won by Joe Biden created fraudulent certificates of ascertainment composed of "alternate electors" to declare Donald Trump had actually won their states, thereby overruling the will of voters. They hoped to pass these fraudulent certificates to vice president Mike Pence on January 6, 2021, so he would reverse Biden's election and certify Trump as the winner, a scheme which became known as the Pence Card. Pence instead counted the authentic slates of electors and properly declared Biden the victor. By June 2022, participants in the alternate electors scheme began receiving subpoenas from the House Select Committee to Investigate the January 6 Attack and the United States Department of Justice.

Upon Trump's victory in the 2016 United States presidential election, the Federalist Society (TFS) played a major role in vetting candidates for the president to appoint to federal courts, including the Supreme Court. TFS, a conservative-libertarian group that advocates a textualist and originalist interpretation of the United States Constitution, had for decades groomed law students and attorneys for federal judgeships, under the leadership of Leonard Leo. After Trump appointed three justices who were current or former TFS members, the Roberts Court had a 6-3 majority of such TFS justices. 

The court's 2022 term was widely characterized as one of its most consequential, as it ruled in favor of major issues sought by conservatives for decades. In a July 2022 research paper entitled "The Supreme Court's Role in the Degradation of U.S. Democracy," the Campaign Legal Center, founded by Republican Trevor Potter, concluded that the Roberts Court "has turned on our democracy" and was on an "anti-democratic crusade" that had "accelerated and become increasingly
extreme with the arrival" of Trump's three appointees.

Elections 

Leo is also involved with the Honest Elections Project (HEP), a major proponent of the independent state legislature theory (ISL), which asserts that a textualist or originalist reading of the Constitution grants state legislatures exclusive authority to establish and enforce state election rules for federal elections, unfettered by oversight from state courts or governors. This interpretation was contrary to previous interpretations of the Constitution, which held that legislatures, courts and governors shared that authority. Critics said that if the ISL was adopted, it would be possible for state legislatures controlled by one party to establish and enforce election rules to suit their partisan objectives, including rejecting certain ballots or procedures to overrule the voting majority in federal elections and declare their party candidates the winners. The only restriction of this authority would be the Electoral Count Act, which requires governors to certify their states' election results; after the 2020 presidential election, the Act was found to have a flaw that Trump attorney John Eastman sought to exploit to advance his Pence Card scheme.

HEP had for years submitted amicus briefs to the Supreme Court advocating the ISL. In June 2022, the Court agreed to hear Moore v. Harper, a case brought by the North Carolina Republican Party, during its next term beginning October 2022. At least four justices had previously signaled support for using the case to rule in favor of ISL. J. Michael Luttig, a former federal appeals court judge who is highly regarded in conservative legal circles, remarked, "Trump and the Republicans can only be stopped from stealing the 2024 election at this point if the Supreme Court rejects the independent state legislature doctrine ... and Congress amends the Electoral Count Act to constrain Congress' own power to reject state electoral votes and decide the presidency." He testified weeks later during a January 6 committee hearing that "Donald Trump and his allies and supporters are a clear and present danger to American democracy."

Restrictions on voting 

Despite extensive research over decades finding that voting fraud is extremely rare, many Republicans assert it is widespread and that actions must be taken to prevent it. Amid persistent false allegations that widespread fraud had led to Trump's 2020 election loss, in 2021 Republicans in multiple states began taking actions to gain control of state and county election apparatuses, limit ballot access and challenge votes. By June, Republicans had introduced at least 216 bills in 41 states to give legislatures more power over elections officials. Republican lawmakers had stripped authority from secretaries of state, who oversee state elections. In Georgia, Republicans removed Democrats of color from local election boards. In Arkansas, they stripped election control from county authorities.

Wisconsin Republicans, led by senator Ron Johnson, sought to dismantle the bipartisan Wisconsin Elections Commission, which the party had created five years earlier. In Michigan and other swing states, Republicans sought to create an "army" of poll workers and attorneys who could refer what they deemed questionable ballots to a network of friendly district attorneys to challenge. Through May 2022, Republican voters had nominated at least 108 candidates, in some 170 midterm races, who had repeated Trump's stolen election lies; at least 149 had campaigned on tightening voting procedures, despite the lack of evidence of widespread fraud. Dozens of these nominees sought offices to oversee the administration and certification of elections.

Anti-democratic tendencies 

By 2021, polling and research indicated a significant shift against democracy among Republicans, both in terms of rhetoric and acceptance of potential political violence. The shift was most pronounced among Republicans who trust Fox News, and more so Newsmax and One America News (OAN), who were more inclined to believe the lie that the 2020 presidential election had been stolen from Trump. A November 2021 Public Religion Research Institute (PPRI) poll found that two-thirds of Republicans believed the election had been stolen, as did 82 percent of those who trust Fox News more than any other media outlet. Ninety-seven percent of those who trust Newsmax and OAN believed the election was stolen. Thirty percent of Republicans agreed with the statement, "true American patriots may have to resort to violence in order to save our country," rising to 40 percent among those who trust Newsmax and OAN; eleven percent of Democrats agreed.
 
Robert Jones, CEO of PRRI, said he was deeply concerned about the poll findings and "we really have to take them seriously as a threat to democracy." Political scientist John Pitney, who was previously a domestic policy and legislative aide for congressional Republicans, remarked, "Back in the 1980s, Republicans aspired to be the party of hope and opportunity. Now it is the party of blood and soil. The culture war is front and center, and for many Republicans, it is close to being a literal war, not just a metaphorical one." Political scientist Larry Bartels, co-director of the Center for the Study of Democratic Institutions at Vanderbilt University, wrote in August 2020 that "substantial numbers of Republicans endorse statements contemplating violations of key democratic norms, including respect for the law and for the outcomes of elections and eschewing the use of force in pursuit of political ends." He ascribed the primary cause to "ethnic antagonism" among Republicans toward immigrants and minorities seeking political power and claims on government resources.

Religious and white nationalism 

During the Trump era, a far-right, populist movement based on Christian nationalism surged, gaining some degree of mainstream acceptance. The ideology of Trumpism broadly adheres to a deeply-held belief that America was founded as a Christian nation. Philip Gorski, a Yale professor of the sociology of religion, calls this "a mythological version of American history." Movement adherents believe their Christian dominance has been usurped by other races and faiths, which Gorski characterizes as a form of racial tribalism: a "'we don't like people who are trying to change [our country] or people who are different' form of nationalism."

Researchers have observed that many in the movement seek to reduce or eliminate the separation of church and state found in the Constitution. Some also believe Trump was divinely chosen to save white Christian America. In their 2022 book, The Flag and the Cross: White Christian Nationalism and the Threat to American Democracy, Gorski and co-author Samuel Perry, a professor of religious studies at the University of Oklahoma, wrote that white Christian nationalists share a set of common anti-democratic beliefs and principles that "add up to a political vision that privileges the tribe. And they seek to put other tribes in their proper place." Some believe in a "Warrior Christ" they will follow with the use of righteous violence.

During a September 2020 presidential debate, Trump was asked if he would condemn white supremacists and militia groups that had appeared at some protests that year. After his opponent Joe Biden mentioned Proud Boys, Trump stated, "Proud Boys, stand back and stand by," adding "somebody's got to do something about antifa and the left because this is not a right-wing problem." After Trump and his allies exhausted legal avenues to overturn the results of the 2020 presidential election, several leaders of Proud Boys and Oath Keepers were federally indicted on seditious conspiracy charges for their alleged roles in the January 6 United States Capitol attack on the Capitol as Congress assembled to certify Biden's election. The Department of Homeland Security stated in October 2020 that white supremacists posed the top domestic terrorism threat, which FBI director Christopher Wray confirmed in March 2021, noting that the bureau had elevated the threat to the same level as ISIS. The release of the DHS findings had been delayed for months, which a whistleblower, the department's acting intelligence chief Brian Murphy, attributed to reluctance of DHS leaders to release information that would reflect poorly on the president in an election year.

Every Republican voted against a July 2022 House measure requiring Homeland Security, the FBI and the Defense Department to "publish a report that analyzes and sets out strategies to combat white supremacist and neo-Nazi activity" in their ranks. A 2019 survey of active service members found that about one third had "personally witnessed examples of white nationalism or ideological-driven racism within the ranks in recent months." About one fifth of those who were charged for participating in the January 6 attack were veterans, with some on active service.

Rachel Kleinfeld, a scholar of global political violence and democracy at the Carnegie Endowment for International Peace, found in July 2022 that Trump's affinity for far-right militia groups dated to his 2016 campaign and such groups had since become increasingly mainstreamed in the Republican Party. She argued the militia influence had spread since the January 6 attack among Republican leaders at the national, state, and local level. Political scientist Barbara Walter, who has studied political violence leading to civil war, commented in March 2022 that "There are definitely lots of groups on the far right who want war. They are preparing for war ... We know the warning signs. And we know that if we strengthen our democracy, and if the Republican Party decides it’s no longer going to be an ethnic faction that’s trying to exclude everybody else, then our risk of civil war will disappear."

Public opinion
One survey between 2017 and 2019 found that a third of Americans want a "strong leader who doesn't have to bother with Congress or elections", and one-quarter had a favorable view of military rule. A research study administered in 2019 found an association between support for Trump and support for executive aggrandizement. Republicans are more likely to support a candidate who suspends Congress or ignores court verdicts. Multiple studies have found that support for democracy among white Americans is negatively correlated with their level of racial prejudice or racial resentment, and that "support for antidemocratic authoritarian governance is associated with some whites' psychological attachment to their racial group and a desire to maintain their group's power and status in the face of multiracial democracy.".

A 2022 Quinnipiac University poll found that 69 percent of Democrats and Republicans and 66 percent of Independents think American democracy is close to collapsing.

Effects
A 2022 study found that certain Americans are less willing to take a hypothetical job in a state characterized as experiencing backsliding, which could potentially impose economic costs. According to Jamie Gillies, Canada may reevaluate historically close Canada–United States relations in response to democratic backsliding in the U.S.

See also 
 
 Corruption Perceptions Index
 Freedom in the World
 List of democracy indices

References

Bibliography

Further reading
 (preview)

2010s in the United States
Democratic backsliding
Politics of the United States
2020s in the United States